The Beriev MDR-5 (Morskoi Dalnii Razvyeedchik - Long-range reconnaissance)(sometimes Beriev MS-5) was a Soviet long-range reconnaissance/bomber flying boat prototype developed by the Beriev design bureau at Taganrog. It did not enter production as the rival Chyetverikov MDR-6 was preferred.

Development
The MDR-5 (Morskoi Dalnyi Razvedchik - naval long-range reconnaissance) was an all-metal twin-engined high-wing cantilever monoplane flying-boat. Designed to be operated by a crew of five it was powered by two Tumansky M-87A radial engines.

Two prototypes were built, the first, a pure flying boat flying which was built in 1938, with the second an amphibian. 

Although MDR-5 was adequate, the rival Chyetverikov MDR-6 had already been ordered into production and the MDR-5 was not developed further and remained as prototypes.

Operators

Soviet Navy

Specifications

See also

References

Notes

Bibliography

 

MDR-5
Flying boats
1930s Soviet military reconnaissance aircraft
High-wing aircraft
Aircraft first flown in 1938
Twin piston-engined tractor aircraft